Submillimetre astronomy or submillimeter astronomy (see spelling differences) is the branch of observational astronomy that is conducted at submillimetre wavelengths (i.e., terahertz radiation) of the electromagnetic spectrum. Astronomers place the submillimetre waveband between the far-infrared and microwave wavebands, typically taken to be between a few hundred micrometres and a millimetre. It is still common in submillimetre astronomy to quote wavelengths in 'microns', the old name for micrometre.

Using submillimetre observations, astronomers examine molecular clouds and dark cloud cores with a goal of clarifying the process of star formation from earliest collapse to stellar birth.  Submillimetre observations of these dark clouds can be used to determine chemical abundances and cooling mechanisms for the molecules which comprise them.  In addition, submillimetre observations give information on the mechanisms for the formation and evolution of galaxies.

From the ground 

The most significant limitations to the detection of astronomical emission at submillimetre wavelengths with ground-based observatories are atmospheric emission, noise and attenuation.  Like the infrared, the submillimetre atmosphere is dominated by numerous water vapour absorption bands and it is only through "windows" between these bands that observations are possible.  The ideal submillimetre observing site is dry, cool, has stable weather conditions and is away from urban population centres.  Only a handful of such have been sites identified.  They include Mauna Kea (Hawaii, United States), the Llano de Chajnantor Observatory on the Atacama Plateau (Chile), the South Pole, and Hanle in India (the Himalayan site of the Indian Astronomical Observatory). Comparisons show that all four sites are excellent for submillimetre astronomy, and of these sites Mauna Kea is the most established and arguably the most accessible. There has been some recent interest in high-altitude Arctic sites, particularly Summit Station in Greenland where the PWV (precipitable water vapor) measure is always better than at Mauna Kea (however Mauna Kea's equatorial latitude of 19 degrees means it can observe more of the southern skies than Greenland).

The Llano de Chajnantor Observatory site hosts the Atacama Pathfinder Experiment (APEX), the largest submillimetre telescope operating in the southern hemisphere,
and the world's largest ground based astronomy project, the Atacama Large Millimeter Array (ALMA), an interferometer for submillimetre wavelength observations made of 54 12-metre and 12 7-metre radio telescopes. The Submillimeter Array (SMA) is another interferometer, located at Mauna Kea, consisting of eight 6-metre diameter radio telescopes. The largest existing submillimetre telescope, the James Clerk Maxwell Telescope, is also located on Mauna Kea.

From the stratosphere
With high-altitude balloons and aircraft, one can get above even more of the atmosphere.  The BLAST experiment and SOFIA are two examples, respectively, although SOFIA can also handle near infrared observations.

From orbit

Space-based observations at the submillimetre wavelengths remove the ground-based limitations of atmospheric absorption.  The first submillimeter telescope in space was the Soviet BST-1M, located in the scientific equipment compartment of the Salyut-6 orbital station.  It was equipped with a mirror with a diameter of 1.5 m and was intended for astrophysical research in the ultraviolet (0.2 - 0.36 microns), infrared (60 - 130 microns) and submillimeter (300 - 1000 microns) spectral regions, which are of interest to those who are interested in which makes it possible to study molecular clouds in space, as well as obtain information about the processes taking place in the upper layers of the earth's atmosphere.

The Submillimeter Wave Astronomy Satellite (SWAS) was launched into low Earth orbit on December 5, 1998 as one of NASA's Small Explorer Program (SMEX) missions.  The mission of the spacecraft is to make targeted observations of giant molecular clouds and dark cloud cores.  The focus of SWAS is five spectral lines: water (H2O), isotopic water (H218O), isotopic carbon monoxide (13CO), molecular oxygen (O2), and neutral carbon (C I).

The SWAS satellite was repurposed in June, 2005 to provide support for the NASA Deep Impact mission.  SWAS provided water production data on the comet until the end of August 2005.

The European Space Agency launched a space-based mission known as the Herschel Space Observatory (formerly called Far Infrared and Sub-millimetre Telescope or FIRST) in 2009. Herschel  deployed the largest mirror ever launched into space (until December 2021, with the launch of the near-infrared James Webb Space Telescope) and studied radiation in the far infrared and submillimetre wavebands. Herschel's mission focused primarily on the origins of galaxies and galactic formation.

See also 
 Event Horizon Telescope
 Terahertz radiation
 Far infrared astronomy
 SCUBA-2 All Sky Survey
 Radio window
 Infrared window
 Optical window
 :Category:Submillimetre telescopes

References

External links 
 Arizona Radio Observatory page on Submillimeter Astronomy
 Atacama Pathfinder Experiment (APEX) Home Page
 Atacama Large Millimeter Array (ALMA) Home Page
 SWAS Home Page
 Herschel Space Observatory

Astronomical imaging
Observational astronomy